Basai is a village in Gurgaon Mandal in Gurgaon District in Haryana state in India.  Basai is 4 km distance from its district main city Gurgaon and 282 km distance from its state main city Chandigarh. It has a population of about 20980 persons living in around 2195 households. Basai village is famed for  Basai wetland home of endangered migrant birds.

Location
Other villages in Gurgaon Tehsil are Jharsa, Gadoli, Bajghera, Bamroli, Kadipur, Khandsa, Chakkarpur, Chandu, Daultabad and Dhanwapur.

Nearby villages of this village with distance are Dhankot (2.916 km) and Sohna (30 km).

Administration
Basai Pin Code is 122006 and Post office name is Basai. Other villages in (122006) are Basai and Gadoli.

Basai wetland

The Basai village is also the location of Basai wetland, recognised globally as an Important Bird Area by the BirdLife International housing 20,000 birds of over 280 species including migratory and endangered birds, has not yet been declared a protected wetland ny the Government of Haryana.

See also
 Gurugram Bhim Kund (Hindi: गुरुग्राम भीम कुंड), also known as Pinchokhda Jhod (Hindi: पिंचोखड़ा जोहड़)
 Delhi Ridge
 Leopards of Haryana
 Gurugram leopard and deer safari
 List of national parks and wildlife sanctuaries of Haryana

References 

Villages in Gurgaon district